Hiiessaare is a village in Hiiumaa Parish, Hiiu County in northwestern Estonia.

Hiiumaa's only airport, Kärdla Airport (ICAO: EEKA), is located in Hiiesaare.

The village is first mentioned in 1798 (Hio). Historically, the village was part of Suuremõisa Manor.

References
 

Villages in Hiiu County